Bicester Aerodrome, formerly RAF Bicester, is an airfield on the outskirts of the English town of Bicester in Oxfordshire. Dating back to 1916, this military airfield is notable as the location of the first flight of the prototype Handley Page Halifax in 1939 and was later the home of No. 71 Maintenance Unit, RAF (Royal Air Force); the RAF finally left in 2004.

The airfield surface is bumpy in places, due to collapsing field drains, requiring care on the part of pilots operating aircraft in those areas.

History
In 1911, flying first took place on the site, when Lt H.R.P Reynolds landed a Bristol Boxkite biplane on the field. Organised flying began in 1916 when a Training Depot was established. In January 1917, the Royal Flying Corps (RFC) moved into the site, then , with the arrival of 118 night bomber squadron. Canvas-covered Bessonneau hangars were used until more substantial aircraft sheds were built.

In November 1918, No. 44 Training Station Depot arrived, followed in 1919 by 5 Squadron, flying Bristol F.2 Fighters returning from France, having flown in the First World War. All the squadrons disbanded by 1920, and the airfield was closed in 1920 after being used briefly as a clearing centre for repatriated soldiers.

In 1925, work began on redeveloping the site as a bomber station, and flying began again in January 1928. Various large RAF bombers operated from the field, including the Vickers Virginia. Other aircraft included Hawker Horsleys and, in 1935, Hawker Harts arrived. In November 1932, the only RAF squadron of Boulton Paul Sidestrands arrived, replaced by Overstrands in 1936.

Development of the station continued throughout this period, with many new buildings being erected.  This included the construction of a connection from the nearby 'Varsity Line' railway to supply the airfield.

Second World War
In 1937/1938, two squadrons of the new Bristol Blenheim bomber arrived, followed in 1939 by two more squadrons with Supermarine Spitfires and Avro Anson support aircraft, forming the No. 1 Camouflage Unit RAF. The aircraft were used for training, with no operational sorties being flown from the field.

Later in 1939, having been built in Cricklewood just before war broke out, the first prototype Handley Page Halifax was taken by road to RAF Bicester and assembled in secret there before the company's chief test pilot Major Jim Cordes and flight test observer E A 'Ginger' Wright made its first flight on 25 October 1939. The type went on to become the first four-engined bomber to drop bombs on Germany in the Second World War.

In July 1940, the second RAF Bomber Command Training Group (No. 7 Group RAF) was formed, with its headquarters at RAF Bicester. This was required due to a demand in operational training, supplying squadrons of No. 2 Group. No. 6 (T) Group RAF and No. 92 (OTU) Group RAF were both connected to the airfield.

Throughout the war, RAF Bicester was used as a training centre, and in April 1940 became home to No. 13 Operational Training Unit RAF, under the control of RAF Bomber Command. In June 1943, the unit transferred to No. 9 Group RAF, RAF Fighter Command, flying Spitfires and de Havilland Mosquitos. Although no offensive missions were flown, flights were not without risk. In April 1940, 13 OTU experienced the first losses of the newly formed Bomber Command operational training units. On 6 December 1941, a Blenheim stalled on take-off, killing all three crew members. Just four days later, a second Blenheim crashed in an identical accident, again with no survivors.

Squadrons

Units

Post-war
At the end of 1944, Bicester became a non-flying unit, used for maintenance, and later as a Motor Transport depot. In 1953, No. 71 Maintenance Unit arrived, that salvaged, repaired, and then transported damaged aircraft.

In 1956, Windrushers Gliding Club arrived, having moved from Little Rissington, and gliding began at the field. In 1963, the Royal Air Force Gliding & Soaring Association (RAFGSA) began using the site, eventually merging with Windrushers Gliding Club. Gliding has taken place at the airfield since 1956. In 1966, No. 1 LAA Squadron RAF Regiment arrived from RAAF Butterworth, Malaysia, along with No. 26 LAA Squadron RAF Regiment − from RAF Changi, Singapore.

In 1976, the RAF ceased to use the airfield as a military base, but still maintained staff there to run the gliding training operation as adventure training for servicemen. In the mid-1980s, the USAF briefly used the Technical and Domestic Area for storage.
In 1982 the USAF created a wartime contingency hospital with 500 beds and all ancillary medical services using restored RAF World War II dormitories. There were between 12 and 20 USAF personnel stationed on site until the beginning of Operation Desert Storm, when they were augmented by 1200 USAF medical personnel from USAF medical Center, Wilford Hall, Lackland Air Force Base, Texas. The facility was used to treat minor physical injuries and possible PTSD patients. The unit was deactivated in 1992.
Between 1979 and 1992, the RAFGSA Centre allowed US servicemen from RAF Upper Heyford to become members. US servicemen, from the US Armed Forces family housing next to the airfield in Bicester, learnt to fly at Bicester as a result.

In 1990, during Operation Desert Shield, the USAF deployed medical personnel to the site, and equipped a number of buildings in both the Technical and Domestic area as a hospital. This was done in anticipation of a large numbers of casualties that never materialized, during the 1991 First Persian Gulf War.
In 1997 the Ministry of Defence placed the Married Quarter sites at RAF Bicester up for disposal by formal tender.

Today
The airfield is a substantially unmodified pre-war RAF station with many listed buildings. The brick-built 1934 "Fort" type 1959/34 control tower survives, as do the two C-type and two A-type aircraft hangars.

During the late 1990s The Welbeck Estate Group/Hodge Group acquired 300 post war and modern Officers and NCO married quarters on the Stratton Fields and The Rowans housing estate.

In the late 1990s, plans were proposed to develop the airfield for housing and industry, but they were abandoned due to strong local opposition and the historic nature of the site. In 2002, Cherwell District Council designated the aerodrome as a Conservation Area.

 In June 2004, the RAF Gliding and Soaring Association moved to RAF Halton. The airfield became home to both Windrushers Gliding Club (reformed in July 2004) who leased the site from the MOD until 2013, with Oxford University Gliding Club and, for a few years, Cranfield University Gliding Club, as sub-sections within the Windrushers club. The club continued to operate from Bicester along with the Oxford University club, but after the existing lease expired the Club went into hibernation on 30 June 2020, it is now hoping to find another site to fly from. At the same time, the Oxford University group moved to Weston on the Green, rejoining Oxford Gliding Club after over 40 years at Bicester.

In 2012, further plans for housing were also refused permission by Cherwell District Council. In March 2013 Bicester Airfield was acquired from the MOD by Bicester Motion Limited with the aim of developing the UK's first business park dedicated to historic motoring and aviation. Bicester Heritage aim to bring together the UK's cottage industry of specialists in order to promote not just the preservation but, specifically, the use of vintage aeroplanes and motor cars.

One of the companies which located in the park was Chiltern Classic Flight, a company which provides training programs for flying and maintaining classic aircraft, including formation flying. They prepare aircraft for and participate in air shows and fly-pasts, and contribute demonstrations to the annual Youth Aviation Day.

Accidents and incidents
 On 6 December 1941 Bristol Blenheim IV Z7962 of No. 110 Squadron RAF was taking off from the airfield but crashed just outside the perimeter, killing all four people aboard. Incorrect trim tab settings were thought to have caused the accident.

References

Further reading

External links
The Wartime Memories Project - RAF Bicester
Windrushers Gliding Club - Bicester Airfield history
WW2 Airfields of Oxfordshire - Bicester
RAF Museum - Vickers Virginia
Controltowers.co.uk - Bicester
VR York (Halifax bomber information
Group Captain Hughie Edwards VC 105 Squadron
Chiltern Classic Flight - Bicester Airfield History
Bicester Heritage Limited

Airports in South East England
Bicester
Royal Air Force stations in Oxfordshire
Royal Air Force stations of World War II in the United Kingdom
Transport in Oxfordshire